Sylvain Templier (born 27 December 1971) is a French nurse and politician who has been Member of Parliament for Haute-Marne's 1st constituency since 2020.

References 

Living people
1971 births
21st-century French politicians
Members of Parliament for Haute-Marne
La République En Marche! politicians
Deputies of the 15th National Assembly of the French Fifth Republic